Hat Hor, also called Hat-Hor (actually Hor-hat), is a possible pharaoh or king of Dynasty 0 who ruled around the Naqada IIIb period.

He is known only from two inscriptions: one inscription found in the eastern Nile Delta and a piece of pottery from Tura.
 his name on a vase found in tomb 1702 of the necropolis of Tarkhan. This inscription has an image of a city that looks like Memphis but lacking a hawk identifier. However, the reading and interpretation of his name is not clear.
 a second inscription from Tura.

See also 
List of pharaohs

References 

Predynastic pharaohs
Year of birth unknown
Year of death unknown